Ishq Forever is a 2016 Bollywood romantic drama musical film directed by Sameer Sippy and starring Krishna Chaturvedi and Ruhi Singh. The film released on 19 February 2016. Music is composed by popular composer Nadeem Saifi. This is a comeback film for Nadeem Saifi after almost a decade.

Plot
Rhea (Ruhi Singh), a free-spirited girl, whose life turns upside down when her father gets appointed as the Prime Minister of India. The fiercely independent Rhea starts to feel stifled because of the security team that accompanies her wherever she goes and the young lady jumps at the chance of an adventure provided by a mysterious stranger Aryan Shekhawat (Krishna Chaturvedi), who she runs off with while on a vacation in South Africa, much to the anguish of her security team led by RAW agents Naina (Lisa Ray) and Amitabh (Javed Jaffrey).

Cast 
 Krishna Chaturvedi as Aryan Shekhawat
 Ruhi Singh as Rhea
 Lisa Ray as Naina
 Javed Jaffrey as Amitabh
 Chetan Pandit 
 Sonal Jha 
 Arif Zakaria as Sheikh's Associate
 Mahesh Balraj as Sheikh's Associate
 Zakir Hussain
 Gurpreet Singh
 Denzil Smith as Karan
 Sachin Parikh as Maheshbabu

Production
The announcement for the film was done in August 2014 when it was reported that the popular music director Nadeem Saifi of the talented Nadeem Shravan duo will be returning to Bollywood with this film as a solo composer. The film will launch a newcomer Krishna Chaturvedi along with model and new actress Ruhi Singh as the female lead. 90 percent of the shooting has been completed and the film is set to be released on 19 February 2016.
 
 Directed by Sameer Sippy
 Produced by Shabbir Boxwala, Ajay Shah, Harry Gandhi
 Written by Shabbir Boxwala
 Starring Krishna Chaturvedi, Ruhi Singh
 Music by Nadeem Saifi
 Executive Producer Huzeifa Lakdawala

Soundtrack 

The soundtrack of the album is composed by Nadeem Saifi (Of Nadeem–Shravan).

Track listing

References

External links 

 Nadeem Saifi returns to B-town without Shravan Rathod – Times of India
 Lisa Ray and Ruhi Singh in Ishq Forever : Bollywood News – Bollywood Hungama
 StarsCubo :: Bollywood Movies, Reviews, Latest News, Wallpapers & Songs

2016 films
2010s Hindi-language films
Indian romantic drama films
2016 romantic drama films